The sixth season of the American television series The Flash, which is based on the DC Comics character Barry Allen / Flash, premiered on The CW on October 8, 2019. The season follows Barry as he navigates through the Crisis and the emergence of Bloodwork and Eva McCulloch. It is set in the Arrowverse, sharing continuity with the other television series of the universe, and is a spin-off of Arrow. The season is produced by Berlanti Productions, Warner Bros. Television, and DC Entertainment, with Eric Wallace serving as showrunner.

The season was ordered in January 2019, and was originally planned to have 22 episodes. Filming began that July, and production was shut down in March 2020 due to the COVID-19 pandemic, leaving the season with only 19 episodes. Grant Gustin stars as Barry, with principal cast members Candice Patton, Danielle Panabaker, Carlos Valdes, Hartley Sawyer, Danielle Nicolet, Tom Cavanagh, and Jesse L. Martin also returning from previous seasons, while LaMonica Garrett was promoted to series regular from his guest status in season five. They are joined by new cast member Efrat Dor while former series regular Keiynan Lonsdale makes a guest appearance. This is the last season to feature Sawyer as a series regular. The series was renewed for a seventh season on January 7, 2020.

Episodes

Cast and characters

Main 
 Grant Gustin as Barry Allen / Flash / Dark Flash
 Candice Patton as Iris West-Allen and Mirror Iris West-Allen
 Danielle Panabaker as Caitlin Snow / Frost
 Carlos Valdes as Cisco Ramon / Vibe and Cisco Ramon / Echo (Earth-19)
 Hartley Sawyer as Ralph Dibny / Elongated Man
 Danielle Nicolet as Cecile Horton
 LaMonica Garrett as Mar Novu / Monitor and Anti-Monitor
 Efrat Dor as Eva McCulloch
 Tom Cavanagh as Nash Wells / Pariah, Eobard Thawne / Reverse-Flash, Harry Wells, and Sherloque Wells
 Jesse L. Martin as Joe West

Recurring 

 Sendhil Ramamurthy as Ramsey Rosso / Bloodwork
 Victoria Park as Kamilla Hwang and Mirror Kamilla Hwang
 Kayla Compton as Allegra Garcia and Maya
 Alexa Barajas as Esperanza Garcia / Ultraviolet
 Patrick Sabongui as David Singh and Mirror David Singh

Guest

"Crisis on Infinite Earths"

Production

Development 
The series was renewed for a sixth season by The CW on January 31, 2019, along with a 22-episode order. In March 2019, it was announced that Eric Wallace would replace Todd Helbing as showrunner for the season.

Writing 
The season is split in two halves, each having their own self-contained Big Bad story. Each half is referred to by the producers as a "Graphic Novel", the first one is titled "Blood and Truth", and the second one titled "Reflections and Lies". The split was done to avoid inducing fatigue by keeping one Big Bad for 22 episodes, as previous seasons had done.

Wallace felt episode 19, which became the season finale due to the COVID-19 pandemic halting all production, worked in the series' favor because it had "a big cliffhanger" that was "a good pause point". The remaining three episodes, which had been written, will become the first three episodes of season seven. Wallace conceded there may be a few small adjustments made based on how the pandemic would affect shooting, but said Eva McCulloch’s story "is on a very specific trajectory that we want to honor and finish." Wallace continued that he thought having these three episodes start season seven was "making it stronger because it's forcing us to look at these two separate things — which is the end of Eva's story and the beginning of the next villain's story and how he relates to Barry and Iris —" and making a strong connection between them.

Casting 
Main cast members Grant Gustin, Candice Patton, Danielle Panabaker, Carlos Valdes, Hartley Sawyer, Danielle Nicolet and Jesse L. Martin return as Barry Allen / Flash, Iris West-Allen, Caitlin Snow / Frost, Cisco Ramon, Ralph Dibny / Elongated Man, Cecile Horton, and Joe West. Tom Cavanagh also returns as a regular, portraying Nash Wells, another doppelgänger of his character Harrison Wells. Cavanagh also returns as Eobard Thawne / Reverse Flash. Valdes also portrayed Cisco's Earth-19 doppelganger "Echo" in the episode "Kiss Kiss Breach Breach". Sendhil Ramamurthy was cast in a recurring role as Ramsey Rosso / Bloodwork, the Big Bad of the season's first half. Efrat Dor appears as a series regular in the second half of the season as Eva McCulloch.

Design 
The season introduces a new Frost costume which has a more vibrant blue color scheme than the older costume, exposes the shoulders and features a chest emblem shaped like an ice crystal.

Filming 
Production for the season began on July 2, 2019, in Vancouver, British Columbia, and was expected to conclude on April 6, 2020. However, on March 13, 2020, production was shut down due to the COVID-19 pandemic. 90% of the planned 20th episode was filmed by that time, with one more day of filming anticipated to complete it. Though it was initially planned for production on the rest of the season to resume later in the year, the remaining episodes were ultimately not filmed as part of the sixth season.

Arrowverse tie-ins 
At the end of the 2018 Arrowverse crossover "Elseworlds", the follow-up crossover was revealed to be "Crisis on Infinite Earths" based on the comic book of the same name. The crossover took place over five episodes–three (including the Flash episode) in December 2019 and two in January 2020.

Release

Broadcast 
The season premiered on October 8, 2019, in the United States on The CW. It was initially set to run for 22 episodes, but as production on the season could not continue due to the COVID-19 pandemic, the nineteenth episode was later announced as the season finale.

Reception

Ratings 
{{Television episode ratings
| title    = The Flash season 6
| title1   = Into the Void
| date1    = October 8, 2019
| rs1      = 0.6/3
| viewers1 = 1.62
| dvr1     = 0.5
| dvrv1    = 1.30
| total1   = 1.1
| totalv1  = 2.92

| title2   = A Flash of the Lightning
| date2    = October 15, 2019
| rs2      = 0.5/3
| viewers2 = 1.27
| dvr2     = 0.5
| dvrv2    = 1.23
| total2   = 1.0
| totalv2  = 2.50

| title3   = Dead Man Running
| date3    = October 22, 2019
| rs3      = 0.5/3
| viewers3 = 1.38
| dvr3     = 0.4
| dvrv3    = 1.07
| total3   = 0.9
| totalv3  = 2.45

| title4    = There Will Be Blood
| date4     = October 29, 2019
| rs4       = 0.5/3
| viewers4  = 1.48
| dvr4      = 0.4
| dvrv4     = 1.03
| total4    = 0.9
| totalv4   = 2.51

| title5    = Kiss Kiss Breach Breach
| date5     = November 5, 2019
| rs5       = 0.4/2
| viewers5  = 1.19
| dvr5      = 0.4
| dvrv5     = 1.06
| total5    = 0.8
| totalv5   = 2.25

| title6    = License to Elongate
| date6     = November 19, 2019
| rs6       = 0.5/3
| viewers6  = 1.29
| dvr6      = 0.4
| dvrv6     = 1.01
| total6    = 0.9
| totalv6   = 2.30

| title7    = The Last Temptation of Barry Allen, Pt. 1
| date7     = November 26, 2019
| rs7       = 0.4/2
| viewers7  = 1.17
| dvr7      = 0.5
| dvrv7     = 1.15
| total7    = 0.9
| totalv7   = 2.32

| title8    = The Last Temptation of Barry Allen, Pt. 2
| date8     = December 3, 2019
| rs8       = 0.5/3
| viewers8  = 1.32
| dvr8      = 0.4
| dvrv8     = 0.99
| total8    = 0.9
| totalv8   = 2.31

| title9    = Crisis on Infinite Earths: Part Three
| date9     = December 10, 2019
| rs9       = 0.6/4
| viewers9  = 1.73
| dvr9      = 0.4
| dvrv9     = 0.98
| total9    = 1.0
| totalv9   = 2.71

| title10   = Marathon
| date10    = February 4, 2020
| rs10      = 0.4
| viewers10 = 1.27
| dvr10     = 0.4
| dvrv10    = 0.81
| total10   = 0.8
| totalv10  = 2.22

| title11   = Love Is A Battlefield
| date11    = February 11, 2020
| rs11      = 0.4
| viewers11 = 1.13
| dvr11     = 0.4
| dvrv11    = 0.94
| total11   = 0.8
| totalv11  = 2.07

| title12   = A Girl Named Sue
| date12    = February 18, 2020
| rs12      = 0.4
| viewers12 = 1.10
| dvr12     = 0.3
| dvrv12    = 0.84
| total12   = 0.7
| totalv12  = 1.95

| title13    = Grodd Friended Me
| date13     = February 25, 2020
| rs13       = 0.4
| viewers13  = 1.17
| dvr13      = 0.3
| dvrv13     = 0.81
| total13    = 0.7
| totalv13   = 1.98

| title14    = Death of the Speed Force
| date14     = March 10, 2020
| rs14       = 0.3
| viewers14  = 1.03
| dvr14      = 0.4
| dvrv14     = 0.91
| total14    = 0.7
| totalv14   = 1.94

| title15    = The Exorcism of Nash Wells
| date15     = March 17, 2020
| rs15       = 0.4
| viewers15  = 1.19
| dvr15      = 0.3
| dvrv15     = 0.85
| total15    = 0.7
| totalv15   = 2.04

| title16    = So Long and Goodnight
| date16     = April 21, 2020
| rs16       = 0.4
| viewers16  = 1.09
| dvr16      = 0.3
| dvrv16     = 0.85
| total16    = 0.7
| totalv16   = 1.94

| title17    = Liberation
| date17     = April 28, 2020
| rs17       = 0.4
| viewers17  = 1.18
| dvr17      = 0.3
| dvrv17     = 0.82
| total17    = 0.7
| totalv17   = 2.00

| title18    = Pay the Piper
| date18     = May 5, 2020
| rs18       = 0.4
| viewers18  = 1.22
| dvr18      = 0.3
| dvrv18     = 0.85
| total18    = 0.7
| totalv18   = 2.07

| title19    = Success is Assured
| date19     = May 12, 2020
| rs19       = 0.4
| viewers19  = 1.08
| dvr19      = 0.3
| dvrv19     = 0.82
| total19    = 0.7
| totalv19   = 1.90
}}

 Critical response 
The review aggregator website Rotten Tomatoes reported a 85% approval rating for the sixth season with an average rating of 6.89/10, based on 5 reviews.

 Accolades 

|-
! scope="row" rowspan="3" | 2020
| Kids' Choice Awards
| Favorite Family TV Show
| data-sort-value="Flash, The"| The Flash| 
| 
|-
| BMI Film, TV & Visual Media Awards
| BMI Network Television Music Award
| data-sort-value="Blume, Nathaniel"| Nathaniel Blume and Blake Neely
| 
| 
|-
| People's Choice Awards
| data-sort-value="Sci-Fi/Fantasy Show of 2020, The"| The Sci-Fi/Fantasy Show of 2020
| data-sort-value="Flash, The"| The Flash| 
| 
|-
! scope="row" rowspan="8" | 2021
| rowspan="2"| Critics' Choice Super Awards
| Best Actor in a Superhero Series
| data-sort-value="Gustin, Grant"| Grant Gustin
| 
| style="text-align:center;" rowspan="2"| 
|-
| Best Superhero Series
| data-sort-value="Flash, The"| The Flash| 
|-
| rowspan="4" | Saturn Awards
| Best Superhero Television Series
| data-sort-value="Flash, The"| The Flash''
| 
| style="text-align:center;" rowspan="4"| 
|-
| Best Actor on a Television Series
| data-sort-value="Gustin, Grant"| Grant Gustin
| 
|-
| Best Actress on a Television Series
| data-sort-value="Patton, Candice"| Candice Patton
| 
|-
| Best Supporting Actress on a Television Series
| data-sort-value="Panabaker, Danielle"| Danielle Panabaker
| 
|-
| rowspan="2" | Leo Awards
| Best Visual Effects in a Dramatic Series
| data-sort-value="Kevorkian, Armen V."| Armen V. Kevorkian Joshua Spivack, Shirak Agresta, Christopher Grocock, and Marc Lougee (for "Grodd Friended Me")
| 
| style="text-align:center;" rowspan="2"| 
|-
| Best Stunt Coordination in a Dramatic Series
| data-sort-value="Kralt, Jonathan"| Jonathan Kralt (for "Death of the Speed Force")
| 
|-
|}

Notes

References 

General references

External links 
 
 

2019 American television seasons
2020 American television seasons
The Flash (2014 TV series) seasons
Television series set in 2019
Television productions suspended due to the COVID-19 pandemic